Trista Nicole Sutter ( Rehn, born October 28, 1972) is an American television personality who was the runner-up on season 1 of The Bachelor before becoming the star of the first season of its companion show, The Bachelorette. Sutter has also appeared on Dancing with the Stars and Fear Factor.

Early life
Sutter was born in Indianapolis, Indiana, and raised in St. Louis, Missouri. Attending Indiana University, she earned a bachelor's degree in exercise science. She attended the University of Miami for her master's degree in physical therapy, and continuing living in Miami, Florida, for five years, working in  pediatric physical therapy at Miami Children’s Hospital while spending two NBA seasons as a dancer for the basketball team the Miami Heat.

The Bachelor
Rehn appeared as a contestant on season 1 of ABC's The Bachelor. She finished runner-up after bachelor Alex Michel selected Amanda Marsh as the winner ahead of Rehn in the show's finale.

The Bachelorette
After her appearance on The Bachelor, Rehn was selected to be featured in the gender-reversed spin-off, The Bachelorette. She chose Ryan Sutter as the winner, and the couple were married on December 6, 2003. They were paid US$1 million by ABC for affording the network the right to televise their wedding ceremony, which was broadcast as the finale of a three-episode special called Trista & Ryan's Wedding. The miniseries, filmed at "The Lodge" luxury resort in Rancho Mirage, California, drew over 26 million viewers.

Television appearances
Under her maiden name, Rehn was a Miami Heat Dancer in the early 2000s. Rehn appeared opposite actor Jason Alexander in a KFC commercial. She also has appeared in country music singer Brad Paisley's music video "Celebrity" in 2003 with Alexander, Little Jimmy Dickens, and William Shatner. In 2005 she made a guest appearance on an episode of NBC's Fear Factor, cheering on Ryan Sutter, who was a contestant.

Sutter was a contestant on season one of the American version of Dancing with the Stars. On June 10, 2011, the Sutters appeared in a Hands Only CPR PSA campaign from the American Heart Association and the Ad Council. In 2014, the Sutters appeared on the program Marriage Boot Camp: Reality Stars. In 2015, the Sutters were contestants in Bachelor Fan Favorites Week on Who Wants to Be a Millionaire. The Sutters also appeared in 2015 on a pilot for Rocky Mountain Reno, a home renovation show; the pilot aired on HGTV.

Personal life
, Sutter resides in Eagle County, Colorado with her husband Ryan and their two children a son named Maxwell Alston was born July 26, 2007 and daughter Blakesley Grace was born April 3, 2009.

References

External links
 Official website
 

1972 births
Living people
Indiana University alumni
People from Indianapolis
People from St. Louis
Leonard M. Miller School of Medicine alumni
American cheerleaders
National Basketball Association cheerleaders
People from Vail, Colorado
Bachelor Nation contestants